Víctor Hugo Herrera Ramos (born October 22, 1970 in Pesca, Boyacá) is a retired male track and road cyclist from Colombia.

Career

1999
3rd in World Cup, Team Pursuit, Mexico City (MEX)
2003
1st in Stage 1 GP Mundo Ciclistico, Mosquera (COL)
2nd in  National Championships, Track, Madison, Elite, Colombia (COL)

Notes

References

External links
 
 
 

1970 births
Living people
Colombian male cyclists
Colombian track cyclists
Central American and Caribbean Games medalists in cycling
Central American and Caribbean Games gold medalists for Colombia
Competitors at the 1998 Central American and Caribbean Games
Pan American Games competitors for Colombia
Cyclists at the 1999 Pan American Games
Sportspeople from Boyacá Department
20th-century Colombian people
21st-century Colombian people